Christian Davenport is the Mary Ann and Charles R. Walgreen Professor for the Study of Human Understanding  and political scientist at the University of Michigan. affiliated with the Ford School of Public Policy as well as the University of Michigan Law School. He is also a Research Professor at the Peace Research Institute Oslo and an Elected Fellow of the American Academy of Arts and Sciences.  Prior to joining the University of Michigan, Davenport was employed at the University of Notre Dame in political science and sociology as well as the Kroc Institute, the University of Maryland in political science, University of Colorado Boulder in political science and the University of Houston in political science.  He received his PhD in 1992 from Binghamton University.

Academic career
Christian Davenport is best known as a scholar of state repression/human rights violation, genocide, civil war, social movements and protest having written 8 books and approximately 50+ academic articles.  While his work mainly concerns global patterns, he has also done research on specific countries as well including the United States (social movements, protest, protest policing and state repression, the Black Power Movement), Rwanda (genocide and civil war), India (untouchability) and Northern Ireland (the Conflict or Troubles). Innovative databases derived from archival sources as well as content analyses are affiliated with both sets of research. Davenport is generally viewed as being one of the founding scholars regarding the quantitative examination of state repression/human rights violation as well as one of the earliest scholars to engage in what has become an effort to explore sub-national, disaggregated, organizational as well as individual-level dynamics within conflict and contention.  While most of his research has been concerned with explaining onset, variation and lethality, newer work has moved to explain termination as well as consequences/legacies/outcomes.

Some of Davenport's work has provided foundational insights about political conflict and contention.  For example, he has shown that there is a "domestic democratic peace" (mirroring the democratic peace in international relations) with democracies being less likely to use repression and when relevant behavior is used it tends to be less violent.  At the same time, he has shown that the democratic peace is vulnerable to reduction and incapacity when political authorities are being challenged behaviorally with protest, terrorism, revolution and insurgency.  He has shown that repression increases the likelihood that some behavioral challengers will escalate their efforts whereas others will remove themselves from harms way as a function of whether or not they experienced repressive behavior directly.  He also found that for certain historical periods African American protests have been policed very differently than white ones in a piece called "Protesting While Black".
This research has been supported by a wide variety of institutions: e.g., 10 grants from the National Science Foundation, one from the Carnegie Foundation, Clingendael Institute, Social Science Research Council and the Research Council of Norway.

Controversies
Davenport researched untouchability and caste discrimination with Martin Macwan, an activist from Gujarat who in 2000 received the Robert F. Kennedy Human Rights Award and Navsarjan Trust, surveying 100 different practices. The government of Gujarat rejected their results, commissioning its own study.

Related, his 2004 estimate about the number of people killed during the Rwanda genocide has been the subject of controversy.  This work was featured in a 2014 BBC documentary incorrectly stating that only 200,000 Tutsi died in the genocide—in contrast to scholarly research suggesting a death toll of at least 500,000 victims. This was inaccurate because the 200,000 figure simply represented the lower estimate provided by Davenport and his research team discussed thoroughly on the project website.  The high estimate was approximately 1.2 million and they stated that they felt most comfortable with an estimate of 500,000 - this was reported back in 2004 and this has been recently identified in a recent article in the Journal of Genocide studies.

Non-academic work
Davenport co-authored two installations of a comic/graphic novel with Darick Ritter of Sequential Potential called RW-94: Reflections on Rwanda based on his research concerning Rwanda between 2000-2004 when he consulted with the National University of Rwanda in Butare as well as the International Criminal Tribunal for Rwanda for first the prosecution and then the defense. In 2020, Davenport started a podcast (adopting the nickname Science) with Professor Derrick Darby (aka Sage) called "A Pod Called Quest". The podcast invites listeners to think with hosts about problems of injustice, just futures, and evidence-based solutions. Another podcast with Professor Jesse Driscoll called "Raiders of the Lost Archive" invites listeners to reconsider those who engage in field and archival work as

Awards
The Victoire Ingabire Umuhoza Prize for Democracy from The International Women’s Network for Democracy and Peace (2020)
The "Engaged Scholar Award" from the Josef Korbel School of International Studies (2016)
University of Denver, Best Book on Racial Power and Social Movements, American Political Science Association (2011)
 Leader of Tomorrow Award from Ebony Magazine (1995).

Works

References

External links
Christian Davenport's faculty page
Christian Davenport's personal page

Living people
University of Michigan faculty
Fellows of the American Academy of Arts and Sciences
American political scientists
21st-century political scientists
Year of birth missing (living people)